Henry the Middle, Duke of Brunswick-Lüneburg (15 September 1468 – 19 February 1532) was Prince of Lüneburg from 1486 to 1520.

Life
Henry of Brunswick-Lüneburg, the son of Otto V of Lüneburg and Anne of Nassau-Siegen, was born in 1468. In 1486, Henry took control of Lüneburg from his mother, who had been regent since the death of Henry’s grandfather, Frederick II, Duke of Brunswick-Lüneburg. Henry’s reign was marked by the complications relating to the Hildesheim Prince-Bishopric Feud. Henry was on the side of the bishop, and was against the nobility of Hildesheim and the Welfs of Brunswick. In 1519, Henry was victorious in the Battle of Soltau, though the intervention of the newly elected Emperor Charles V transformed the victory achieved on the battlefield into a defeat. Henry was on the side of the French during the election, and so earned the enmity of Charles V. Henry’s two eldest sons became regents of the country, and Henry went into exile at the French king’s court. Henry returned in 1527 during the beginning of the Reformation in Lüneburg, and tried to regain control of the land with help from those opposed to the Reformation. His attempt failed, and Henry returned to France, only to return in 1530. He spent his last days in the princely house in Lüneburg, which had been given to him by his eldest son. After the death of his first wife, Margaret of Saxony, Henry married, unequally, Anna von Campe. He was buried in the abbey of Wienhausen where his gravestone can still be seen today.

Children
Henry and Margarete of Saxony (1469–1528) had the following children:
Anne (1492–??)
Elisabeth (1494–1572) m. Charles II, Duke of Guelders (1467–1538)
Otto I (1495–1549)
Ernest I the Confessor (1497–1546)
Apollonia (1499–1571) Nun
Anna (1502–1568) m. February 2, 1525 Duke Barnim IX of Pomerania (1501–1573)
Francis (1508–1549)

Ancestors

Literature
Ferdinand Spehr: Heinrich der Mittlere. In: Allgemeine Deutsche Biographie (ADB). Bd. 11, Leipzig 1880, S. 492–495.

References

1468 births
1532 deaths
Princes of Lüneburg
Middle House of Lüneburg